Gåsodden (The Goose Point) is a headland in Bünsow Land at Spitsbergen, Svalbard. It is the southwestern point of Bünsow Land. At the southern side of Gåsodden is Sassenfjorden, and at the northwestern side is Billefjorden.

References

Headlands of Spitsbergen